Dharam Kot also known as Nawan Kot is a small village located in Wazirabad Tehsil, Gujranwala District, Punjab, Pakistan.

Demography 
Dharam Kot has a population of over 700 and is located about 29 kilometres northwest of Gujranwala city.

Education 
For education in the village a Government Schools are functional by Government of Punjab, Pakistan under Board of Intermediate and Secondary Education, Gujranwala. For higher-level education some student move to Rasool Nagar and Kalaske Cheema, for higher university level education people move to Gujranwala and Gujrat, Pakistan. While some private institute also functions in the area.

 Government Girls Primary School (GGPS), Dharam Kot
 Government Boys Primary School (GPS), Dharam Kot

Communication 
The only way to get Dharam Kot is by road. The Dharam Kot is directly connected with Rasool Nagar. Besides driving your own car (which takes about 50 minutes from Gujranwala, 15 minutes from Kalaske Cheema). The Wazirabad-Faisalabad rail link is the only nearest railway line and Rasool Nagar is the nearest railway station.

See also 
 Kot Asaish
 Bega Khurd
 Bega Kalan

References 

Villages in Gujranwala District